Hartcliffe is the name of both a council ward and an Outer Suburb of the city of Bristol in the United Kingdom which lies within that ward. The ward contains the areas of Hartcliffe and Headley Park, as well as small portions of Withywood and Bishopsworth.

Hartcliffe is a post-World War II suburban development, consisting largely of council houses. It is one of the poorer areas of Bristol, with significant social problems exacerbated by the decline of industrial employment in the city. Regeneration efforts are underway.

Overview

Hartcliffe is a district of Bristol, England. It is a council estate on the southern edges of the city next to Withywood, on the northern slopes of Dundry Hill.  Construction started in 1952 after the compulsory purchase of a number of pre-existing farms. A small shopping area was built (Symes Avenue), and the first church (St Andrew) opened in 1956.

Imperial Tobacco once had offices and a factory in Hartcliffe. Part of the site is now the Imperial Retail Park while the listed headquarters building is being converted into the Lakeshore flats.

Hartcliffe and Withywood Community Partnership (HWCP) was formed by local residents in 1998 to help support the regeneration and renewal of the area.

Schools within Hartcliffe include Fair Furlong Primary School, Hareclive Academy, and Bridge Learning Campus.

Hartcliffe Community Farm was opened in 1979 by Hartcliffe Community Council leader Doris Fiedor MA Hons UWE (1919–1995) who founded the community farm. A 250-year-old tithe barn was erected at the farm by YTS trainees but burned down in an arson attack. The farm remains open daily to the public and hosts regular visits by school parties.

Symes Avenue is the District Shopping Centre serving the outer estates of Hartcliffe and Withywood with a total population of around 20,000 people. The estates, built in the 1950s and 1960s, have long been identified as suffering a multitude of different problems which characterise a socially excluded community. On 16 July 1992 there was a riot in Hartcliffe estate after two men who were riding a stolen and unmarked police motorbike were killed in a chase with an unmarked police  car. The disturbance lasted for three days. Police were stoned and many shops in the Symes Avenue shopping centre were attacked and destroyed. Around the same time, Liberal Democrat leader Paddy Ashdown claimed that health indicators in the area were comparable to those of a Third World country.

On 12 November 2007, a Morrisons supermarket opened after a massive redevelopment of the area.  The redevelopment also includes a new library.

According to crime statistics between 2017–2018, The Groves, an area in Hartcliffe, is considered one of Bristol's ten most dangerous streets.

Headley Park
Headley Park is a suburb of Bristol. The original estate was built between 1934 and 1938. It is located in South Bristol between Bedminster Down, Bishopsworth, Knowle West and Hartcliffe, and is a largely residential area.

The area is served by one public house, The Maytree which is located on St Peters Rise.

The main Christian Church serving the area is located on St Peters Rise.  A church has been on the site for 60 years, and was originally known as Crossways Tabernacle but since 2007 was renamed Headley Park Church following a partnership between Crossways Tabernacle and Kensington Baptist Church in the north of Bristol.

Bishopsworth and Withywood

The areas of Bishopsworth and Withywood lie partly in the Hartcliffe ward, but are mostly in the Bishopsworth ward.

References

Areas of Bristol
Wards of Bristol
City farms in Bristol
Places formerly in Somerset